Live: Vječna vatra (trans. Live: Eternal flame) is the first live album by Dino Merlin, released in 1999.

Originally released as a double album "Vječna vatra" contains all of Dino Merlin's best hit singles recorded live.

Track listing

Disc 1 

"Smijehom strah pokrijem" (studio)
"Jel' Sarajevo gdje je nekad bilo"
"Vojnik sreće"
"Zar je to sve što je ostalo"
"Učini mi pravu stvar"
"Da ti kažem šta mi je"
"Nešto lijepo treba da se desi"
"Kokuzna vremena"
"Moja bogda sna"
"Uspavanka za Gorana B."

Disc 2 

"De facto Fato"
"Mjesečina"
"Danas sam O.K."
"Nemam ja 18 godina"
"Ja potpuno trijezan umirem"
"Ne zovi me na grijeh"
"Paša moj solidni"
"Bosnom behar probeharao"
"Fotografija"

External links
Live: Vječna vatra at Dino Merlin's official web site

Dino Merlin albums
1999 live albums